The Protection of the Theotokos Chapel is a historic Russian Orthodox chapel on Kodiak Island, Alaska, along E Street at Akhiok, Alaska. Now it is under Diocese of Alaska of the Orthodox Church in America

The church was built early in the 20th century, exact date not known but soon after 1900. It is not the first church on the site.  It has a unique design, one that is simple, but with "details reminiscent of the more ambitious churches built ten to twenty years earlier at Belkofsky and Karluk".  It has an approximately  nave and a  altar chamber.

It was added to the National Register of Historic Places in 1980.  The Ascension of Our Lord Chapel at Karluk and the Holy Resurrection Church at Belkofski were also listed on the National Register on the same date.

See also
National Register of Historic Places listings in Kodiak Island Borough, Alaska

References

Russian Orthodox church buildings in Alaska
Churches on the National Register of Historic Places in Alaska
Buildings and structures in Kodiak Island Borough, Alaska
Buildings and structures on the National Register of Historic Places in Kodiak Island Borough, Alaska
Russian Orthodox chapels